The Sadr Region (also known as IC 1318 or the Gamma Cygni Nebula) is the diffuse emission nebula surrounding Sadr (γ Cygni) at the center of Cygnus's cross. The Sadr Region is one of the surrounding nebulous regions; others include the Butterfly Nebula and the Crescent Nebula. It contains many dark nebulae in addition to the emission diffuse nebulae.

Sadr itself has approximately a magnitude of 2.2. The nebulous regions around the region are also fairly bright.

Image gallery

See also
NGC 6910

References

http://stars.astro.illinois.edu/sow/sadr.html

H II regions
Cygnus (constellation)
IC objects